South Dakota High School Activities Association governs high school sports and other activities in the state of South Dakota. The SDHSAA was founded in 1905 and has been a member of the National Federation of State High School Associations since 1923.

External links
Official website

High school sports associations in the United States
Organizations based in South Dakota
Sports organizations established in 1905
Sports in South Dakota
1905 establishments in South Dakota